Selina Follas (born 1976 in Adelaide) is a former softball player from Australia, who won a bronze medal at the 2000 Summer Olympics.

References 

1976 births
Living people
Australian softball players
Olympic softball players of Australia
Softball players at the 2000 Summer Olympics
Olympic bronze medalists for Australia
Sportswomen from South Australia
Olympic medalists in softball
Sportspeople from Adelaide
Medalists at the 2000 Summer Olympics